IILM University, or in its full name Institute of Integrated Learning in Management University, is a private university located in Gurgaon, Haryana, India. It was established on 6 April 2018 under the Haryana Private Universities (Amendment) Act, 2018, after the Bill was approved by the Haryana Legislative Assembly in March 2018. It evolved from the Gurgaon campus of IILM Institute for Higher Education, established 1993.

References

External links

Universities in Haryana
Universities and colleges in Gurgaon
Educational institutions established in 2018
2018 establishments in Haryana
Private universities in India